Ratcliffe-on-Soar is a village and civil parish in Nottinghamshire on the River Soar. It is part of the Rushcliffe district, and is the site of Ratcliffe-on-Soar Power Station. Nearby places are Kingston on Soar, Kegworth and Trentlock. With a population of around 100, measured at 141 in the 2011 Census, the parish is too small to have a parish council and so has a parish meeting. Although the village does not contain any shops, it has a church and a marina which is often affected by severe flooding as it built on designated floodplain, just before the Soar joins the River Trent at Trentlock.

History

Mesolithic scrapers and Neolithic flints have been found in Ratcliffe-on-Soar.

Ratcliffe is one of three nearby settlements whose name preserves the Brittonic word for "ramparts" (cf. Gaelic rath ), along with Ratby and the Roman ruins at Leicester, known as Ratae Corieltauvorum.

Evidence of a Roman villa and other structures has been found in the village, as well as Roman pottery.

In the Domesday Book of 1086 the village is listed as Radeclive.

The area was a filming location for the 2010 movie Skeletons.

Transport
The Midland Main Line runs by the village, which is served by the East Midlands Parkway railway station. A shuttle bus service runs from the railway station to East Midlands Airport.

References

External links

Villages in Nottinghamshire
Civil parishes in Nottinghamshire
Rushcliffe